Maurice Savin (October 17, 1894 – 1973), born Maurice Louis Savin, was a French artist, painter, ceramicist and tapestry-maker his works are included in many private and public collections.

Biography
Maurice Savin was born in the Drôme in south-eastern France. He studied art before being conscripted into the French military in 1914. He was wounded twice, during World War I, being awarded the Croix de Guerre.

After the war, Savin worked for various magazines and journals as an illustrator, during this period he continued to paint and had exhibitions in Paris at, for example, the Salon d’Automne. In 1933, he began working in ceramics, producing a mural for city hall in Montelimar in 1936.

Notes and references

External links
Official website

1894 births
1973 deaths
20th-century French painters
20th-century French male artists
French male painters